Harald Ringstorff (25 September 1939 – 19 November 2020) was a German politician of the Social Democratic Party (SPD) and the 3rd Minister President of the state of Mecklenburg-Vorpommern. He headed a coalition government of the SPD and PDS (since 2007 the Left Party, Die Linke) from 1998 until 2006, and subsequently headed a coalition between the SPD and CDU. He was the 61st President of the Bundesrat in 2006/07.

After his Abitur and military service, Ringstorff studied Chemistry at the University of Rostock. He received his Ph.D. in 1969. Afterwards he worked as a chemist for the Rostock dockyards. From 1987 to 1990, he was director of the branch office of the VEB Kali-Chemie ("people's enterprise for potash chemistry").

In 1989 Ringstorff was a founding member of the Social Democratic Party in the GDR and a member of the freely elected Volkskammer of 1990. From 1990 to 2003 he was chairman of the SPD in Mecklenburg-Vorpommern.

Since 1990 Ringstorff has been a member of the Landtag of Mecklenburg-Vorpommern where he served as parliamentary leader of the SPD from 1990–1994 and 1996-1998. In between he was Minister for Economic and European Affairs and vice-minister-president in a coalition government with the CDU under minister-president Berndt Seite (CDU).

In 1998, the SPD agreed to form a coalition with the PDS (now Left Party), a move controversial within the party. Ringstorff was elected minister-president. His coalition government was re-elected in 2002. After the elections of 2006, he decided to switch to a coalition with the CDU, which would have a more comfortable majority in parliament.

On 6 August 2008, Ringstorff let it be known that he wished to resign as minister-president because of his age. On 6 October, he was succeeded in the office by Erwin Sellering.

He died from Parkinson's disease on 19 November 2020.

References

External links 

1939 births
2020 deaths
People from Ludwigslust-Parchim
Presidents of the German Bundesrat
Members of the Landtag of Mecklenburg-Western Pomerania
Social Democratic Party of Germany politicians
People from Mecklenburg
University of Rostock alumni
Grand Crosses with Star and Sash of the Order of Merit of the Federal Republic of Germany
Recipients of the Order of the Cross of Terra Mariana, 2nd Class
Ministers-President of Mecklenburg-Western Pomerania